Domain Central is an outlet shopping centre in Townsville. It is Queensland's largest major outlet, containing 50 stores including major retailers such as Harvey Norman, JB Hi-Fi, Freedom Furniture, Lincraft, TK Maxx (formerly Trade Secret) and a number of other homemaker, fashion and discount outlets. The shopping centre was developed in 2006 and 2007 by Lancini Developments.

Stores
Domain Central remains primarily a homemaker mall, with the great majority of the center's 50+ retailers specializing in furniture, interior design or consumer electronics. There is, however, also a number of fashion retailers in the center as well as some smaller specialist businesses.

References

External links
Domain Central Townsville - official site

Shopping centres in Townsville
Shopping malls established in 2007